The Folkes Brothers were a Jamaican ska group, composed of John, Mico, and Junior Folkes, best known for the single "Oh Carolina".

History
The group's 1961 single "Oh Carolina" was the first hit record produced by Prince Buster, and is regarded as a landmark in the history of ska and reggae.

In 1994, John Folkes and Buster were involved in a legal dispute over the authorship of the song, after a cover version by Shaggy became an international hit. It was eventually ruled by the High Court in London, England, that Folkes held the copyright. Later, Folkes assigned the copyright to Greensleeves so that Shaggy's Pure Pleasure album could be released. This included listing Henry Mancini as co-author, because it was alleged that Shaggy sampled the "Peter Gunn" theme song. Dr. John Folkes never agreed to this.

The group recorded an album with Jah D replacing the head, founder, composer and creator of the group John Folkes in 2011.  John's older brother Mico started a new group that was not related to the original Folkes Brothers, as that original group was created by John and neither Junior nor Mico were responsible for the creation of original group, or the songs, "Oh Carolina" and "I Met a Man",  as both were written and composed by John, with Mico and Junior singing back up. Mico, the elsest, was known as the " Carolina Man" in the early 60s locally as he often took credit for "Oh Carolina" although he had nothing to do with its writing or composition.

John Folkes passed away August 29, 2022 at the age of 80.

Discography

Singles
"Oh Carolina" (1961)

Albums
Don't Leave Me Darling (2011)

References

Jamaican ska groups